Rachel Storch (born September 5, 1972) is an American politician who served in the Missouri House of Representatives from the 64th district from 2005 to 2011.

References

1972 births
Living people
Democratic Party members of the Missouri House of Representatives
Women state legislators in Missouri